The Kwerbic, or Greater Kwerba, languages are a family of just under a dozen Papuan languages spoken in Indonesia.

Classification
The Kwerba family is clearly established. Its closest relative appears to be Isirawa. Mawes is added by Ross (2005), but not retained by Usher; Isirawa was rejected by Ross, but retained by Usher and by Donohue (2002). Usher also adds Kapauri–Sause.

Capell (1962) proposed placing Kwerba and Isirawa in a Dani–Kwerba proposal, which was retained in Stephen Wurm's 1975 Trans–New Guinea phylum.  Malcolm Ross (2005) removed them and linked them with another erstwhile branch of TNG in a Tor–Kwerba proposal. Usher follows Ross, but adds the Nimboran languages as well.

Foley (2018)
Foley (2018) provides the following classification.

Usher (2020)
Usher uses the label 'West Foja Range' to avoid the ambiguity of the name 'Kwerb(a/ic)'.

Basic vocabulary
Basic vocabulary in Kwerba family languages (Isirawa, Kwerba, Kauwera, Samarokena) listed by Foley (2018) is provided below. Data for Samarokena is limited, but clear cognates linking Samarokena to the other Kwerba languages include the words for ‘fire’, ‘man’, ‘stone’, and ‘sun’ (note that hV- is assumed to be an accretion).

{| 
|+ Kwerba family basic vocabulary
! gloss !! Isirawa !! Kwerba !! Kauwera !! Samarokena
|-
| ‘bird’ || apre || kaijetin || kaceten ||
|-
| ‘blood’ || asmɪra || kumwa || sac ||
|-
| ‘bone’ || awa || kak || kaka ||
|-
| ‘eat’ ||  || na- || nanam ||
|-
| ‘egg’ || cawarfa || koret || inəm || mehinia
|-
| ‘eye’ || nuera || nukwe || nuk ||
|-
| ‘fire’ || aniva || siraba || ser || hesida
|-
| ‘ground’ || u || isiu || esiu || era
|-
| ‘hair’ || perisira || nerij || niric ||
|-
| ‘I’ || e || co || co || ata
|-
| ‘leg’ || teni || tɪnic || tenij ||
|-
| ‘louse’ ||  || negwan || neːnun ||
|-
| ‘man’ || ɪ || ana- || ana || ana
|-
| ‘one’ || mri || aberias || abic || oha
|-
| ‘penis’ || taun || tau || taua ||
|-
| ‘see’ || warɪ- || wa- || uwarim ||
|-
| ‘sky’ || ono || onis || unis ||
|-
| ‘stone’ || bati || ton || ton || obəta
|-
| ‘sun’ || sobe || abij || abic || habesia
|-
| ‘tooth’ || wana || kwanə || kwan ||
|-
| ‘tree’ || warara || ic || ic ||
|-
| ‘two’ || napnɪ || nenemwan || ninic || ened
|-
| ‘water’ || pu || pitu || pitew || bipihina
|-
| ‘we’ || ne || nino || neno || niːna
|-
| ‘woman’ || avi || es || is ||
|-
| ‘you (sg)’ || mɪ || ame || am || ama
|}

See also
Orya–Tor languages

References

 
Foja Range languages